Psammostyela is a genus of ascidian tunicates in the family Styelidae. The genus is monotypic.

References

Stolidobranchia
Tunicate genera